Ravsalyn Otgonbayar (born 31 May 1955) is a Mongolian boxer. He competed at the 1976 Summer Olympics and the 1980 Summer Olympics. At the 1980 Summer Olympics, he lost to Carlos Gonzalez of Mexico.

References

External links
 

1955 births
Living people
Mongolian male boxers
Olympic boxers of Mongolia
Boxers at the 1976 Summer Olympics
Boxers at the 1980 Summer Olympics
Place of birth missing (living people)
Asian Games medalists in boxing
Boxers at the 1978 Asian Games
Boxers at the 1982 Asian Games
Asian Games bronze medalists for Mongolia
Medalists at the 1978 Asian Games
AIBA World Boxing Championships medalists
Featherweight boxers
21st-century Mongolian people
20th-century Mongolian people